Alta Records was a record label founded in Dallas, Texas in the early 1960s by pioneer, radio personality Jim Lowe.   Lowe was a popular DJ who hosted a rhythm and blues program "Kat's Karavan" from the WRR-AM studios located at Fair Park in Dallas. He was one of the first DJs in the Southwest to introduce early R&B recording artists to a mainstream, white audience. His program became enormously popular and was broadcast well into the 1960s. Lowe was also noted for airing his "Library Of Laughs" which featured many up and coming comics like Brother Dave Gardner and Justin Wilson.

Jim Lowe was a prominent record/music force in the DFW area having founded several labels including White Rock Records, Division Records and Alta Records . Lowe was also the voice of "Big Tex" at the State Fair of Texas for many, many years.

Alta Records were produced for the Top 40 radio market and they had several chart successes. Jim Lowe "The Cool Fool" (as he was known as) died in 2000 but left a legacy of popular recordings that have become highly prized collectibles in the world of vinyl.

 Submitter's Note: Dallas' Jim Lowe should not be confused with the Jim Lowe who recorded "Green Door" for Dot Records.

Alta Records discography
 100: Gloria Barr: "Ain't That A Crying Shame"/"Love Me"
 101: Adam Lee: "Cruel Cruel World"/"Stairway of Love"
 102: The Destinys: "Think About It"/"What's Up"
 103: Odell Booker: "Chi Bob"/"Come Cry On My Shoulder"
 104: Gene Summers: "You Said You Loved Me"/"Tomorrow"
 105:
 106: Gene Summers: "Dance Dance Dance"/"Juke Box Memories"
 107: Larry Agan: "Honey Don't"/"Cryin' Time"
 108: Jimmy Velvit: "That's All I Got From You" (w/Bobby Hendricks)"/"I Got A Feeling"
 109: Jimmy Velvit: "Sometimes I Wonder"/"My Heart Is In Your Hand"
 110: 
 111: Peyton Park: "Bad Mouth"/"Blue Norther (1964)
 112: Smokey's Stompers: "Gone"/"My Days Are Numbered"
 113: Glenn Keener: "Oil Break"/"Tracking"
 114: Susie Johnson: "Sweet Bird"/"Mourning Dove"
 115: Susie Johnson: "10,000 Tears"/"Time Hurries by"

See also 
 List of record labels

Record labels established in 1960
American independent record labels
Rhythm and blues record labels
Rock and roll record labels